The enzyme chlorogenate hydrolase (EC 3.1.1.42) catalyzes the reaction

chlorogenate + H2O  caffeate + quinate

This enzyme belongs to the family of hydrolases, specifically those acting on carboxylic ester bonds.  The systematic name is chlorogenate hydrolase. Other names in common use include chlorogenase, and chlorogenic acid esterase.

References

 
 

EC 3.1.1
Enzymes of unknown structure